Armstrong Water Aerodrome  is located  south of Armstrong, Thunder Bay District, Ontario, Canada.

See also
Armstrong Airport
Armstrong/Waweig Lake Water Aerodrome

References

Registered aerodromes in Ontario
Transport in Thunder Bay District
Seaplane bases in Ontario